The Liverpool F.C.–Manchester City F.C. rivalry between English football clubs Liverpool and Manchester City began in the 2010s, with City beating Liverpool to the 2013–14 title by just two points on the final day of the season. In the 2016 Football League Cup Final, City beat Liverpool on penalties. Liverpool and Manchester City met in European competition for the first time in the 2017–18 UEFA Champions League quarter-finals, where Liverpool won 5–1 on aggregate. In the 2018–19 season, City won the title on the final day, with their 98 points and Liverpool's 97 being the third- and fourth-highest Premier League points totals ever. The following season, Liverpool won the title with 99 points (the second-highest Premier League total ever after Manchester City's 100 in 2017–18) to finish 18 points above runners-up City. In the 2021–22 season, City again won the title on the final day, beating Liverpool by a single point once more. Since the 2017–18 season, Liverpool and City have produced six of the eight highest points totals since the Premier League became a 38-game league in 1995, and players and managers from Liverpool and City have dominated the individual awards in English football since 2018, with each Premier League Player of the Season award, FWA Footballer of the Year award, PFA Players' Player of the Year award and PFA Young Player of the Year award going to players from the two clubs, and each Premier League Manager of the Season award going to either Pep Guardiola or Jürgen Klopp.

Inter-city rivalry

Since the industrial revolution there has been a consistent theme of rivalry between the two cities based around economic and industrial competition. Manchester through to the 18th century was the far more populous city, and held a position of significance and notability as representative of the north. By the late 18th century, Liverpool had grown as a major sea port – critical to the growth and success of the northern cotton mills. Over the next century, Liverpool grew to supersede Manchester and throughout the late 19th and early 20th century was often described as the British Empire's second city. The links between the two cities were strengthened with the construction of the Bridgewater Canal, the Mersey and Irwell Navigation, and the world’s first inter-city railway, the Liverpool and Manchester Railway, for the transport of raw materials inland.

The construction of the Manchester Ship Canal, funded by Manchester merchants, was opposed by Liverpool politicians and bred resentment between the two cities. Tension between working class Liverpool dockers and labourers in Manchester was heightened after its completion in 1894, just three months prior to the first meeting between Liverpool and Newton Heath in a play-off match that would see Newton Heath relegated to the Second Division.

Today, the crests of both the city of Manchester and Manchester City include stylised ships representing the Manchester Ship Canal and Manchester's trade roots. The ship is also included on the crest of many other Mancunian institutions such as Manchester City Council and rivals Manchester United.

Post-war shifts in economic ties, reliance on regional coal, and shifts in transatlantic trade patterns caused by the growth of Asian labour markets caused the gradual decline of British manufacturing. While the city of Liverpool suffered the loss of its primary source of income to southern port cities, Manchester maintained some of its manufacturing heritage. This reversal of fortunes happened against the backdrop of shifting political backgrounds and significant events in British culture and society in the second half of the 20th century.

Both cities were part of the county of Lancashire until March 1974, upon the enactment of the Local Government Act 1972. Since then, Liverpool and Manchester each respectively anchor the neighbouring metropolitan counties of Merseyside and Greater Manchester.

The two cities continue to be strong regional rivals, vying for influence of surrounding areas. Their continued importance to the UK economy has been reflected with the awarding of the 2002 Commonwealth Games to Manchester, while Liverpool was awarded the title of 2008 European Capital of Culture as part of its ongoing regeneration.

More recent projects by Peel Ports have sought to re-establish the economic links between the Port of Liverpool and Port of Manchester, including re-developing trade links via the Manchester Ship Canal.

Football rivalry
Liverpool and Manchester City were not traditional rivals, with Liverpool having had much more success historically. At the time of the Abu Dhabi United Group takeover of City in 2008, Liverpool had won five European Cups, a record eighteen domestic top-flight league titles, seven FA cups and a record seven Football League Cups; City, conversely had won zero European Cups, two domestic top-flight league titles, four FA Cups and two Football League Cups. By 2008, however, neither team were dominant domestically, with Liverpool having not won a top-flight league title since 1990, and City since 1968.

When the teams played each other in the 2014 International Champions Cup in the United States, the rivalry took on another sporting angle in the host country due to the ownership of the two clubs; City Football Group's partners in their Major League Soccer team New York City FC – Yankee Global Enterprises – own the New York Yankees Major League Baseball franchise, who have a strong rivalry with the Boston Red Sox – a subsidiary of Fenway Sports Group, the owners of Liverpool.

Manchester City consecutively won the 2017–18 and 2018–19 seasons, the latter season in which Liverpool were challenging for the title and putting up an intensive battle against the winners. These seasons are considered the escalating point in the rivalry between the two clubs (though the rivalry had already begun in the early 2010s during Manchester City's dramatic rise to success), with both having been the mutual rival of Manchester United for decades. Prior to this, the 2013–14 season was the last one to have both Manchester City and Liverpool compete against each other at the top for the title, with the former having won it for the fourth time in their history.

Players and managers from Liverpool and City have dominated the individual awards in English football since 2018, with each Premier League Player of the Season award, FWA Footballer of the Year award, PFA Players' Player of the Year award and PFA Young Player of the Year award going to players from the two clubs, and each Premier League Manager of the Season award going to either Pep Guardiola or Jürgen Klopp.

Rivalry between managers

A large part of the rivalry between Liverpool and Manchester City which has developed since the late 2010s has been that of the rivalry of their managers, Jürgen Klopp and Pep Guardiola respectively.

Though the majority of journalism on the rivalry of the two has been around their time in England, it was formed originally in Germany. With Guardiola managing Bayern Munich and Klopp leading Borussia Dortmund - collectively the two most successful German clubs, contesting a rivalry known as Der Klassiker - the two faced off eight times in under two years, including three cup finals. They each won four of those eight matches, with Klopp taking two of the three trophies they contested. Both men would move directly from Germany to England at the end of their contracts; Klopp joined Liverpool on 8 October 2015, while on 1 February 2016 it was announced that Guardiola would join City for the 2016–17 season.

Jürgen Klopp and Pep Guardiola, the managers of Liverpool and Manchester City respectively, in the mid-2010s have developed a rivalry, having been the respective managers of Der Klassiker rivals Borussia Dortmund and Bayern Munich in the Bundesliga previously. At the end of the 2018–19 season, Guardiola described his relationship with Klopp as a "beautiful rivalry" and called Klopp's Liverpool team "the strongest opponents I have faced in my career as a manager". In September 2019, Klopp hailed Guardiola for being his 'greatest rival ever', after both the two were nominated for the FIFA Men's Coach of the Year award in 2019, which Klopp won.

Honours
Historically, Liverpool has won more trophies than Manchester City, with the latter achieving a breakthrough success only in the 2010s, following their purchase by the Abu Dhabi United Group. Liverpool has 14 European honours to Manchester City's 1, but City have been more successful domestically in the modern era, winning six league titles since 2011, while Liverpool ended their 30-year title drought by winning the 2019–20 Premier League.

Table correct as of 30 July 2022.

Head-to-head
The below table demonstrates the competitive results between the two sides (not indicative of titles won). League includes the Premier League, League Division One and League Division Two. The Lancashire Section and the War Leagues are not included.

Matches 
The table below shows the matches played between Manchester City and Liverpool, separated by home, as in matches played at Manchester City's home stadium (following a nomadic embryonic existence, City resided at Hyde Road from 1887 to 1923, then Maine Road until 2003, and finally the City of Manchester Stadium from the 2003–04 season onwards) are shown in the left hand table and matches played in Liverpool's home stadium (Anfield) are shown on the right. Cup finals are typically played at a neutral location such as the England national football team home stadium (Wembley).

Shared player history

See also

 List of association football club rivalries in Europe
 1915 British football betting scandal
 Liverpool–Manchester rivalry

References

External links
11vs11 - complete results
World Football - complete results
LFC Stats - complete results

Manchester City
Manchester City F.C.
England football derbies